The 2004 St Helens Metropolitan Borough Council election took place on 10 June 2004 to elect members of St Helens Metropolitan Borough Council in Merseyside, England. The whole council was up for election with boundary changes since the last election in 2003 reducing the number of seats by six. The Labour Party lost overall control of the council to no overall control.

Background
Since the 2003 election boundary changes reduced the number of councillors from 54 to 48, while also reducing the number of wards from 18 to 16.

Election result
Labour lost their majority of the council, after losing 9 seats to take exactly half of the seats on the council, with 24 councillors. The Labour leader of the council, Marie Rimmer held her seat in West Park after 3 recounts, while Labour councillors Terry Hanley, Jeff Molyneux and Marlene Quinn were among those to be defeated. Meanwhile, the Liberal Democrats gained 3 seats to have 18 councillors and the Conservatives won 6 seats. Overall turnout at the election dropped to 40% from 48% in 2003, despite the election being held with all postal voting as in 2003.

Following the election Labour continued to run the council with all of the executive being Labour councillors, after an agreement between the Labour and Conservative group leaders. This saw Conservative Betty Lowe becoming the new mayor, but only after agreeing not to use her vote at full council meetings.

Ward results

References

2004
2004 English local elections
2000s in Merseyside